The short Ganz railcar is a railcar train type formerly operated by Ferrocarriles Vascongados in the Basque Country, Spain from 1928 to 1981.

History
Due to an increase in traffic, Ferrocarriles Vascongados decided in the 1920s to electrify most of its network. A series of six railcars was ordered to Ganz in 1928 for use in the Bilbao-San Sebastián line. These railcars were mechanically identical to the other series, but were noticeably shorter. They were numbered MACD 1–5. Unlike most railcars of the time, they were constructed in metal.

In the 1940s, three of them (MCD 3, 4 and 5) had their gear ratios modified.

After the introduction of second hand Alsthom railcars in 1951, the short Ganz railcars were relegated to shunting services. In 1989 it was selected for preservation at the Basque Railway Museum, and in 1995 it was restored by CAF in its Irun facilities.

See also
 Ferrocarriles Vascongados § Rolling stock

References

External links
 

Railcars of Spain
Ferrocarriles Vascongados rolling stock
Train-related introductions in 1928
Ganz Works